Per Lindstrand (born 8 September  1948) is a Swedish aeronautical engineer, pilot, adventurer and entrepreneur. He is particularly known for his series of record-breaking trans-oceanic hot air balloon flights and, later, attempts to be the first to fly a Rozière balloon around the Earth – all with British entrepreneur, Sir Richard Branson. He is also the founder of eponymous Lindstrand Balloons hot air balloon manufacturer based in Oswestry, England.

Lindstrand not only flies balloons, but many other aircraft as well, and holds an airline transport pilot's licence for single and multi-engined land and sea aeroplanes and helicopters, and a commercial pilot's licence for autogyros, airships and gliders. His long standing dream to make a flight around the world in a hot air balloon (as opposed to a Rozière or gas balloon which requires no constant source of heated air) still remains unrealized. His distance, duration and altitude records have made him one of the best known balloonists and aerostat designers and engineers in the world.

Early life 

Lindstrand's aeronautical career began in the Swedish Air Force where he was an Engineering Officer. His first balloon flight in the early 1970s was the result of a bet. He built a makeshift balloon and successfully flew it across the runway while in the Swedish Air Force to claim victory. (When he flew more conventional military aircraft, he chose to use call sign, Polar Per.)

Lindstrand later gained a master's degree in aeronautical engineering and worked for Saab Aircraft in Sweden and Lockheed in the United States. He saw his second hot air balloon in 1975 when a neighbour in Sweden purchased it from a British company. When Lindstrand learned that this new balloon was supposed to be state-of-the-art, he decided that he could do better.

Company history 
With Swedish aircraft engineer and entrepreneur, Håkan Colting, he formed Colting Balloons which operated in Ireland from 1976. In 1978 the company moved to Oswestry, England, to be closer to major markets in the UK and Europe. When Håkan Colting moved to Canada, Lindstrand continued to run the renamed Colt Balloons (later Thunder & Colt Balloons after acquiring UK-based Thunder Balloons).

In December 1991 Lindstrand founded Lindstrand Balloons Ltd. and later created a specialized aerospace company, Lindstrand Technologies Ltd. (both based in Oswestry) to manufacture and repair aerostats, airships, gas balloons, passenger-carrying tethered aerostats and other fabric engineering products (including architectural structures, innovative fire-safety devices for road tunnels and inflatable flood defence barriers).  In 2002, Lindstrand Balloons was asked to manufacture the complex parachute for the Mars-lander, Beagle 2. Beagle 2 was launched in June 2003, but supposedly failed to land successfully on the Planet Mars on Christmas Day 2003. However, in January 2015 was it located on the surface of Mars in a series of images from NASA's Mars Reconnaissance Orbiter HiRISE camera. The images suggest that it landed safely, but two of the spacecraft's four solar panels failed to deploy, blocking the spacecraft's communications antenna. Follow the Beagle 2 link above for more info.

Lindstrand Balloons, in partnership with Daimler Chrysler Aerospace of Germany, was awarded a design contract by the European Space Agency to develop a high altitude long endurance airship for possible use in the telecommunications market. Resulting from this, Lindstrand was awarded the German-based Korber Prize for engineering excellence.

Record flights 

From early in his business career, Lindstrand's main interest and ambition lay in pushing the boundaries of lighter-than-air technology and he subsequently captured every absolute world record for hot air balloon flight.

Ascending from Plano, Texas, on 6 June 1988, Lindstrand set a new world altitude record for hot-air balloons, reaching 19,811 meters (64,997 feet). The record stood until 26 November 2005, when Vijaypat Singhania exceeded it.

In January 1991, in  the Virgin Pacific Flyer (a hot air balloon measuring 74,000 m³ (2,600,300 ft³), designed and built by Thunder & Colt), Lindstrand and Branson completed the longest flight in lighter-than-air history when they flew 6761 miles from Japan to Northern Canada. Their flight set two new world records for distance and duration and they broke their own ground speed record, recording  245 mph (395 km/h).  The Virgin Pacific Flyer still remains the largest hot air balloon ever built.

In an attempt to be the first to fly a balloon of any type around the world, in December 1998, Lindstrand, partnered by Richard Branson and Steve Fossett, flew for 7 days and covered over 20,000 km in a Rozière balloon, launching from Morocco and landing in the Pacific Ocean near to rescue services in Hawaii.

Rather less successful was his attempt in 1983 to achieve the world altitude record for hot-air balloons. Sponsored by the English and Welsh Milk Industry, a vast balloon emblazoned with "Milk's gotta lotta bottle" was prepared for launch to be broadcast on live television early one Saturday morning. Adverse weather conditions led to the mission being aborted, but the balloon filled with air whilst being towed along the ground. Lindstrand was holding one of the ropes, and was lifted 30 feet into the air. On letting go, he fell to the ground, sustaining a dislocated shoulder. The accident, including the fall, was seen and heard on the television broadcast.

Recognition 

Lindstrand received the Royal Aero Club's Gold Medal from Prince Andrew twice, in 1989 and 1991, and the Royal Aero Club's Britannia Trophy in 1988. He is a recipient of America's highest flying award, the Harmon Trophy, given to him by Vice President Quayle in the White House. In February 2006, he was awarded an Honorary Fellowship by the Royal Institute of British Architects for "his highly innovative work in the field of inflatables and their application to habitable structures". Lindstrand is also in the Guinness Hall of Fame.

References

External links 
 Lindstrand Technologies Ltd. (UK company)
 Lindstrand Balloons Ltd. (UK company)
 Lindstrand Balloons US (independently owned US affiliate/licensee)
 Filmmakers for Atlantic, Pacific and Global flights

Swedish balloonists
Aerospace engineers
Swedish aviators
Swedish engineers
Swedish businesspeople
1948 births
Living people
Britannia Trophy winners
Flight altitude record holders
Balloon flight record holders